is a railway station in the town of Aga, Higashikanbara District, Niigata Prefecture, Japan, operated by East Japan Railway Company (JR East).

Lines

Station layout
The station consists of a ground-level  island platform serving two tracks, connected to the station building by a footbridge. The station has a Midori no Madoguchi staffed ticket office.

Platforms

History

The station opened on 1 June 1913. With the privatization of Japanese National Railways (JNR) on 1 April 1987, the station came under the control of JR East. A new station building was completed in September 2009.

Passenger statistics
In fiscal 2017, the station was used by an average of 787 passengers daily (boarding passengers only).

Surrounding area
 Aga Town Hall
 Agano River
 
 
 Toyomi Post Office

See also
 List of railway stations in Japan

References

External links

 JR East station information 

Railway stations in Niigata Prefecture
Ban'etsu West Line
Railway stations in Japan opened in 1913
Aga, Niigata